Kampala International University in Tanzania (KIUT) is a private university in Dar es Salaam, Tanzania.

History 

Kampala International University in Tanzania (KIUT) was established in Tanzania in 2008 as a Dar es Salaam Constituent College of Kampala International University in Uganda.  It was then known as Dar es Salaam Constituent College affiliated to the Kampala International University (KIU-DCC). The main goal of the college was to run academic and professional courses offered by Kampala International University (KIU) through the Open and Distance Learning (ODL) mode of course delivery.

KIU-DCC's initial main office location address was at the 8th Floor of Posta House Building along the  Uganda/Ohio street junction in the Dar es Salaam metropolis, opposite the then offices of the Higher Education Accreditation Council (HEAC) that later changed to the Tanzania Commission for Universities (TCU). In November 2009, the College main office was relocated to the Quality Plaza Building along the current Julius K. Nyerere Road. The growth in student numbers, in 2010, reflected in the number of applications received for admission, forced the college leadership to search for a new permanent location that would facilitate the offer of university education through both ODL and residential modes of course delivery. This move was, in part, the effort of the then leadership of KIU-DCC to respond to social demand, particularly by Tanzanian youth, for more places to pursue Higher Learning studies. Ultimately, the college leadership managed to acquire, from the Hon. Kate Kamba's family, a 148-acre piece of land in the Gongo la Mboto Village, in Ilala District, still in the Dar es Salaam Region.

On 15 January 2011, the Tanzania Commission for Universities (TCU) issued the college interim recognition through granting the KIU-DCC a Certificate of Provisional Registration (CPR) and, later on 27 September 2012, issuing the College a Certificate of Full Registration (CFR). Five years later, vide a letter referenced CB.40/78/01/51, dated 17 July 2017, the Tanzania Commission for Universities (TCU) approved the aspired new status of KIU-DCC as a full-fledged university under the new name of “The Kampala International University in Tanzania (KIUT)”. The University's first Chancellor was and still is His Excellency, Ali Hassan Mwinyi, the retired Third Phase President of Zanzibar as well as being the retired Second Phase President of the United Republic of Tanzania.

References

External links
 

Universities in Dar es Salaam
Kampala International University
Educational institutions established in 2009
2009 establishments in Tanzania